Fake Metal Jacket (stylized as FAKE METAL JACKET) is the second album by Japanese idol group Bish released through the independent label Sub Trax on January 20, 2016. The album is the first full album by the group to feature Lingling and Hashiyasume Atsuko, who joined the group on August 5, 2015. The album features four re-recorded versions of tracks from their first album, updated to feature the two new members. Like their debut album Brand-new idol Shit, songs from the album were posted for streaming on SoundCloud little by little on the group's account as well as being released as free downloads on Ototoy for a limited time. All new songs from the album were eventually streamable, and the music videos for both the new version of "MONSTERS", and "ALL YOU NEED IS LOVE" were uploaded on YouTube. The album was preceded by the single "OTNK", released on September 2, 2015.

Track listing

Personnel
BiSH – Lyrics on Track 2
Cent Chihiro Chittiii – vocals; lyrics on Track 13
Aina the End – vocals
Momoko Gumi Company – vocals; lyrics on Tracks 8, 9 and 12
Hug Mii – vocals; lyrics on Track 7
Lingling – vocals; lyrics on Track 5
Hashiyasume Atsuko – vocals; lyrics on Track 4
Ex. Bish
Yukako Love Deluxe – lyrics on Track 3

Notes
All writing, arrangement and personnel credits taken from the album insert.

References

2016 albums
BiSH albums